Kathryn Johnson (born October 25, 1991) is an American rugby sevens player. She won a silver medal at the 2015 Pan American Games as a member of the United States women's national rugby sevens team. She was selected as a member of the United States women's national rugby sevens team to the 2016 Summer Olympics.

Johnson was named in the Eagles squad for the 2022 Pacific Four Series in New Zealand. She was then selected in the Eagles squad for the 2021 Rugby World Cup in New Zealand.

References

External links 
 USA Rugby Profile

1991 births
Living people
United States international rugby sevens players
Female rugby sevens players
American female rugby sevens players
Rugby sevens players at the 2015 Pan American Games
Pan American Games silver medalists for the United States
Rugby sevens players at the 2016 Summer Olympics
Olympic rugby sevens players of the United States
Pan American Games medalists in rugby sevens
University of Wisconsin–Milwaukee alumni
People from Hopkins, Minnesota
Medalists at the 2015 Pan American Games